Survival is a 1975 album by American R&B group The O'Jays, released on the Philadelphia International Records label.

Reception
Recorded at Sigma Sound Studios in Philadelphia, and produced by Kenny Gamble and Leon Huff, Survival includes the R&B chart-topping single "Give the People What They Want" and "Let Me Make Love to You", which reached #10 on the same chart.  Survival matched exactly the chart performance of its predecessor Ship Ahoy, topping the R&B chart and peaking at #11 on the pop chart.

According to AllMusic's Ron Wynn, Survival "followed the spectacular Back Stabbers and Ship Ahoy" as a "good, but not on the same level" album featuring "many strong ballads and good message tracks". Wynn adds that, "while it may not have been as epic in its performances and compositions, it was certainly the other albums' equal in sales strength." The Village Voice critic Robert Christgau wrote more harshly of the LP: "Except for the astonishing 'Rich Get Richer,' based on a text by Ferdinand Lundberg, this is the drabbest studio album this group has made since joining Gamble-Huff. Unfortunately, 'Rich Get Richer' is not the single." The jazz writer Rob Backus cites the song as a politically charged work in progressive soul.

Track listing

Charts
Album

Singles

See also
List of number-one R&B albums of 1975 (U.S.)

References

External links
Survival at Discogs

1975 albums
The O'Jays albums
Albums produced by Kenneth Gamble
Albums produced by Leon Huff
Albums arranged by Bobby Martin
Albums recorded at Sigma Sound Studios
Philadelphia International Records albums